Jamisontown is a suburb of Sydney, in the state of New South Wales, Australia. It is 56 kilometres west of the Sydney central business district, in the local government area of the City of Penrith, and is part of the Greater Western Sydney region. It is on the eastern side of the Nepean River, just south of Penrith and bears the name of Thomas Jamison, a pioneer landowner and First Fleet surgeon.

History

Aboriginal culture
Prior to European settlement, what is now Jamisontown was home to the Mulgoa people who spoke the Darug language. They lived a hunter-gatherer lifestyle governed by traditional laws, which had their origins in the Dreamtime. Their homes were bark huts called 'gunyahs'. They hunted kangaroos and emus for meat, and gathered sweet potatoes, berries and other native plants.

European settlement
In 1805, the then Surgeon-General (Principal Surgeon) of the Colony of New South Wales, Thomas Jamison (1752/53-1811), was granted  on the banks of the Nepean River, to the south of what is now Jamison Road. Later, the property passed to his son, Sir John Jamison (1776–1844), Kt, MD, MLC - a celebrated physician, land owner and political reformer, who erected a splendid mansion (since destroyed by fire) on the nearby Regentville estate during the 1820s.

The land at Jamisontown stayed rural for the next 150 years or so. In 1911, it was the departure point for the first cross-country flight in Australia, made by William Ewart Hart. In the 1960s the area began to be subdivided and developed and in 1976, Jamisontown was officially gazetted as a neighbourhood.

Jamison Town Post Office opened on 10 May 1889 and closed in 1931.

The sikh locals formed 	 Sydney Gurdwara Penrith (Sikh Association of Australia) as well.

Transport
Mulgoa Road is the main road in the suburb, connecting with both Penrith and the M4 Western Motorway which in turn provides quick connection to greater Sydney and the Blue Mountains. The nearest railway station is at Penrith on the Western Line of the Sydney Trains network. 

Busways provides three bus services in the area with route 791 connecting Jamisontown to Penrith, route 795 connecting to Penrith and Mulgoa, and route 797 connecting to Penrith and Glenmore Park.

Local Attractions
The Penrith Ice Palace is located in Jamisontown close to the river.

Education
Jamisontown Public School is the only school in the suburb. Jamison High School is actually located in South Penrith.

Population

Demographics 
According to the 2016 census of Population, there were 5,500 people in Jamisontown.
 Aboriginal and Torres Strait Islander people made up 3.2% of the population. 
 The most common ancestries were English 28.4%, Australian 27.3%, Irish 8.6%, Scottish 6.6% and German 3.1%
 74.9% of people were born in Australia. The next most common country of birth was England at 4.7%.   
 83.6% of people spoke only English at home. 
 The most common responses for religion were Catholic 28.4%, No Religion 23.9% and Anglican 22.3%.

Notable residents
 Thomas Jamison (1745–1811), NSW surgeon-general and colonial landholder in Jamisontown.

Governance
At a local government level, Jamisontown is part of the south ward of Penrith City Council, represented by Jim Aitken, Mark Davies, Karen McKeown, Susan Page and Gary Rumble. The current mayor is Pat Sheehy. At the state level, it is part of the Electoral district of Penrith, represented by Liberal Stuart Ayres. Federally, it is part of the Division of Lindsay, represented by Liberal Party Melissa McIntosh.

References

External links
 Penrith Local Suburb Profiles

Suburbs of Sydney
City of Penrith